Haundorf is a municipality in the Weißenburg-Gunzenhausen district, in Bavaria, Germany.

On the southeastern edge of the municipality is the Brombachmoor nature reserve.

References

Weißenburg-Gunzenhausen